The Philippine Army Museum is a military museum located within the premises of Fort Bonifacio in Taguig, Philippines.

History
The Philippine Army Museum was established in 1979. In the late 1980s, Commanding General of the Philippine Army Mariano Adalem had the former US Army Commanding General headquarters converted into the Philippine Army Museum and Library. The Fort Bonifacio Tunnel was also integrated into the museum's exhibits. Both museum and tunnel were inaugurated in 1989. During the 1990s, the museum was relocated when a substantial portion of Fort Bonifacio was converted into the business and residential district now known as Bonifacio Global City.

Exhibits
The static outdoor exhibits include various specimens of decommissioned artillery, tanks and armored personnel carriers. The indoor exhibits include galleries of uniforms, weapons, colors and displays on various Philippine Army campaigns. As of 2018, an addition to the latter features the Battle of Marawi.

Gallery

See also
Armed Forces of the Philippines Museum
Philippine Air Force Aerospace Museum

References

Military and war museums in the Philippines
Museums in the Philippines